Walter Middelberg (30 January 1875, in Zwolle – 15 September 1944, in Zwolle) was a Dutch rower who competed in the 1900 Summer Olympics.

He was part of the Dutch boat Minerva Amsterdam, which won the bronze medal in the eight event.

References

External links

 profile

1875 births
1944 deaths
Dutch male rowers
Olympic rowers of the Netherlands
Rowers at the 1900 Summer Olympics
Olympic bronze medalists for the Netherlands
Sportspeople from Zwolle
Olympic medalists in rowing
Medalists at the 1900 Summer Olympics